Sand City is a city in Monterey County, California, United States, located on the shores of Monterey Bay, and surrounded on most sides by the larger city of Seaside. The population was 325 at the 2020 census. The city is predominantly a business community, and has a number of larger retail stores. The West End area of Sand City, once an industrial area, hosts a growing artists' colony. Every August, the artists of Sand City and neighboring areas hold a street fair called the "West End Celebration".

Geography

History
Sand City incorporated in 1960. The Sand City post office opened in 1961, but has now been combined with the Seaside post office and shares Seaside's ZIP code (93955) as well. The city is mostly industrial.

Demographics

2010
At the 2010 census Sand City had a population of 334. The racial makeup of Sand City was 223 (66.8%) White, 13 (3.9%) African American, 3 (0.9%) Native American, 16 (4.8%) Asian, 1 (0.3%) Pacific Islander, 61 (18.3%) from other races, and 17 (5.1%) from two or more races. Hispanic or Latino of any race were 123 people (36.8%).

The census reported that 291 people (87.1% of the population) lived in households, 43 (12.9%) lived in non-institutionalized group quarters, and no one was institutionalized.

There were 128 households, 37 (28.9%) had children under the age of 18 living in them, 43 (33.6%) were opposite-sex married couples living together, 12 (9.4%) had a female householder with no husband present, 4 (3.1%) had a male householder with no wife present.  There were 16 (12.5%) unmarried opposite-sex partnerships, and 0 (0%) same-sex married couples or partnerships. 42 households (32.8%) were one person and 3 (2.3%) had someone living alone who was 65 or older. The average household size was 2.27.  There were 59 families (46.1% of households); the average family size was 2.98.

The age distribution was 59 people (17.7%) under the age of 18, 33 people (9.9%) aged 18 to 24, 147 people (44.0%) aged 25 to 44, 86 people (25.7%) aged 45 to 64, and 9 people (2.7%) who were 65 or older.  The median age was 34.1 years. For every 100 females, there were 124.2 males.  For every 100 females age 18 and over, there were 139.1 males.

There were 145 housing units at an average density of 49.6 per square mile, of the occupied units 18 (14.1%) were owner-occupied and 110 (85.9%) were rented. The homeowner vacancy rate was 10.0%; the rental vacancy rate was 7.4%.  45 people (13.5% of the population) lived in owner-occupied housing units and 246 people (73.7%) lived in rental housing units.

2000
At the 2000 census there were 261 people in 80 households, including 33 families, in the city. The racial makeup of the city was 71.26% White, 4.98% African American, 3.07% Native American, 1.53% Asian, 14.56% from other races, and 4.60% from two or more races. Hispanic or Latino of any race were 27.59%.

Of the 80 households 21.3% had children under the age of 18 living with them, 27.5% were married couples living together, 7.5% had a female householder with no husband present, and 58.8% were non-families. 41.3% of households were one person and 10.0% were one person aged 65 or older.  The average household size was 2.46 and the average family size was 3.42.

The age distribution was 16.1% under the age of 18, 11.5% from 18 to 24, 39.8% from 25 to 44, 27.6% from 45 to 64, and 5.0% 65 or older.  The median age was 38 years. For every 100 females, there were 151.0 males.  For every 100 females age 18 and over, there were 154.7 males.

The median income for a household in the city was $34,375, and the median family income  was $37,500. Males had a median income of $27,500 versus $30,000 for females. The per capita income for the city was $15,455.  About 17.9% of families and 27.9% of the population were below the poverty line, including 17.9% of those under the age of eighteen and 50.0% of those sixty five or over.

See also
Coastal California
List of school districts in Monterey County, California
List of tourist attractions in Monterey County, California

References

External links

Cities in Monterey County, California
Incorporated cities and towns in California
Populated coastal places in California